Paudalho is a city in northeastern Brazil, in the State of Pernambuco.

Geography

 Region - Zona da mata Pernambucana
 Boundaries - Tracunhaém (N), São Lourenço da Mata, Chã de Alegria, Camaragibe and Glória do Goitá (S), Carpina and Lagoa do Itaenga (W), Paulista and Abreu e Lima (E)
 Hydrography - Capibaribe and Goiana rivers
 Vegetation - Subcaducifólia forest
 Climate - Hot tropical and humid
 Annual average temperature - 
 Distance to Recife -

Economy

The main economic activities in Paudalho are based in extractive Poor translation from Portuguese?)}} industry, commerce and primary sector especially sugarcane and cattle.

Economic indicators

Economy by Sector
2006

Health Indicators

References

Municipalities in Pernambuco